Events from the year 1774 in art.

Events
 Marie Louise Élisabeth Vigée-Lebrun becomes a member of the Académie.

Works

 Thomas Gainsborough – Portrait of Sir William Blackstone
 Anton Graff – Johann Georg Sulzer 
 Thomas Jones – The Bard
 Angelica Kauffman – Portrait of Lady Georgiana, Lady Henrietta Frances and George John Spencer, Viscount Althorp
 Sir Joshua Reynolds – Portrait of Charles Coote, Earl of Bellamont, in robes of the Order of the Bath
 Richard Wilson – Pembroke Town and Castle

Births
 January 5 – George Chinnery, English painter working in Asia (died 1852)
 February 17 – Raphaelle Peale, considered the first professional American painter of still-life (died 1825)
 April 18 – Antonio Basoli, Italian painter, interior designer, engraver and professor (died 1848)
 May 13 – Pierre-Narcisse Guérin, French painter (died 1833)
 June 10 – Carl Haller von Hallerstein, German art historian (died 1817)
 August 30 – Henri Van Assche, Belgian painter (died 1841)
 September 5 – Caspar David Friedrich, German Romantic painter (died 1840)
 date unknown
 Giovanni Balestra, Italian engraver (died 1842)
 William Barnard, English mezzotint engraver (died 1849)
 Lisa Erlandsdotter, Swedish artist (died 1854)
 Jean-Pierre Franque, French historical subjects and portraiture painter (died 1860)
 Gai Qi, poet and painter born in the west of China under the Qing dynasty (died 1829)
 William Jennys, American naïve art portrait painter (died 1859)
 Archer James Oliver, British portrait painter (died 1842)
 Johann Georg Primavesi, German etcher and painter, primarily of landscapes (died 1855)
 Richard Sass, English landscape painter, etcher, and drawing master to royalty (died 1849)
 Charles Henry Schwanfelder, English animal, landscape and portrait painter (died 1837)
 Marie-Denise Villers, French painter specializing in portraits (died 1821)

Deaths
 January 1 – Jan Jerzy Plersch, Polish sculptor of German origin (born 1704/1705)
 January 13 – Shem Drowne, American coppersmith and tinplate worker (born 1683)
 January 28 – Antonio Galli Bibiena, Italian architect, also at Vienna Hofburg (born 1700)
 April 11 – Elias Gottlob Haussmann, German painter (born 1695)
 April 23 – Christian Wilhelm Ernst Dietrich, German painter (born 1712)
 May 17 – Jeremiah Theus, Swiss-born American painter, primarily of portraits (born 1716)
 July 9 – Anna Morandi Manzolini, Italian sculptor in wax (born 1714)
 August 26 – Philipp Jakob Straub, Austrian sculptor (born 1706)
 September 10 – Pierre-Jean Mariette, French art collector (born 1694)
 October 27 – Gerolamo Mengozzi Colonna, Italian quadratura painter (born 1688)
 December 31 – Johann Christoph Handke, Moravian Baroque painter (born 1694)
 date unknown
 Marie-Elisabeth Simons, Belgian painter (born 1754)
 Philippe Caffieri, French sculptor (born 1714)
 Simon François Ravenet, French engraver (born 1706)
 probable – Anton Čebej, Slovenian baroque painter (born 1722)

 
Years of the 18th century in art
1770s in art